The 1999 World Snooker Championship (also referred to as the 1999 Embassy World Snooker Championship for the purposes of sponsorship) was a professional ranking snooker tournament that took place between 17 April and 3 May 1999 at the Crucible Theatre in Sheffield, England.

John Higgins was the defending champion, but he lost in the semi-finals 10–17 against Mark Williams and became another World Champion who fell to the Crucible curse and could not defend his first World title.

Stephen Hendry won his seventh and final World title by defeating Mark Williams in the final by 18 frames to 11.  The tournament was sponsored by cigarette manufacturer Embassy.

Tournament summary
 Stephen Hendry won the world title for a seventh time, a record in the modern era, beating Ray Reardon and Steve Davis' six titles. Hendry won all his titles in the 1990s while Davis won his six in the 1980s and Reardon won his in the 1970s.
 During his first round match, Steve James compiled the 500th century break at the Crucible in frame seven.
 Ronnie O'Sullivan came close to a maximum break in his semi-final match with Hendry. He missed the last pink to the middle pocket and his break ended at 134.
 O'Sullivan and Hendry made the most century breaks in a single match at the World Championship with eight. The two players also made 4 centuries in 4 frames, with two tons each, the first time this has happened in any ranking event.
 Dominic Dale scored 167 points in one frame in his match against Nigel Bond. He earned 44 penalty points and then made a century break, setting a record for the highest number of points scored in one frame during professional competition. Dale's record stood for over 22 years until Jimmy Robertson scored 178 points in a single frame at the 2021 Scottish Open.

Prize fund 
The breakdown of prize money for this year is shown below: 

Winner: £230,000
Runner-up: £135,000
Semi-final: £68,000
Quarter-final: £34,000
Last 16: £18,350
Last 32: £12,500
Last 48: £9,250
Last 64: £6,000

Last 96: £3,700
Last 134: £300
Stage one highest break : £2,000
Stage two highest break : £20,000
Stage two maximum break: £147,000
Total: £1,400,000

Main draw
Shown below are the results for each round. The numbers in parentheses beside some of the players are their seeding ranks (each championship has 16 seeds and 16 qualifiers).

Century breaks
There were 53 century breaks in the championship. The highest break was 142 made by John Higgins and 143 made by both Stephen Maguire and Barry Pinches at the televised and the qualifying stages respectively.

 142, 132, 127, 126, 124, 108, 104, 104, 100  John Higgins
 140, 123, 109, 104, 101, 100  Mark Williams
 137, 108  Tony Drago
 137  Steve James
 136, 130, 110  James Wattana
 135, 134, 122, 120, 110, 105, 100  Ronnie O'Sullivan
 133  John Parrott
 132, 126, 109, 108, 106, 104, 104, 101  Stephen Hendry

 131, 114  Chris Small
 128, 110, 104  Stephen Lee
 124, 120, 100  Matthew Stevens
 122  Dominic Dale
 120, 109  Joe Perry
 108, 103  Anthony Hamilton
 104  Ken Doherty
 103, 103  Mark King

Qualifying 

The qualifying matches were held between 3 January and 20 March 2000 at the Newport Centre in Newport, Wales.

Round 1–2

Overseas

Round 1

Round 2–3

References

1999
World Championship
World Snooker Championship
Sports competitions in Sheffield
April 1999 sports events in the United Kingdom
May 1999 sports events in the United Kingdom